William Hill (18 June 1827 – 5 January 1889) was an English architect who practised from offices in Leeds, West Yorkshire, England.

He was a member of, and designed churches for the Methodist New Connexion. His son William Longfield Hill (1864–1929) succeeded him in the practice, and later joined in partnership with Salmon L. Swann of Sheffield.

Early life

William Hill was born in Halifax, West Yorkshire, and educated at the West Riding Propriety School, a Nonconformist school in Wakefield, also in West Yorkshire.  In about 1843 he became a pupil in the Leeds architectural practice of Perkin and Backhouse, the town's most successful firm at the time.  Hill opened his own office in June 1850 at 59 Albion Street, Leeds.

Career and works

Hill's first recorded commission was in 1852 to build a terrace of nine houses, and his work for the next five years was at a similar, mundane level.  At this time most architects traditionally confined their works to the area close to their office.  Hill was to gain commissions for more substantial buildings, and for gaining such commissions in other parts of the country.  Webster identifies two reasons for this: the first was his willingness to enter competitions for the design of buildings in other parts of the country, and the second being his membership of the Methodist New Connexion.  The latter movement arose from a schism within the Methodist Church, and was a movement that encouraged using an architect for their chapels who was one of their members.  From this source came commissions for chapels in Leeds, Leicester, Dewsbury, Sheffield, Stockport, Halifax, Birmingham, Durham, and Hanley.  Commissions came from other Nonconformist chapels, the Wesleyan Methodists, the Congregationalists, the Unitarians, the Baptists, the United Methodist Free Churches, and even for churches for the Church of England.  The architectural styles he used for these chapels and churches were both Neoclassical and Gothic.

Hill's willingness to enter competitions further afield resulted in his gaining commissions for corn exchanges in Devizes, Wiltshire, Banbury, Oxfordshire, and Hertford, for which he produced broadly similar Neoclassical designs.  Hill also entered competitions for new cemeteries, workhouses, town halls, poor law offices, Mechanics' Institutes, markets, and dispensaries.  Following his success in some of these competitions, he also gained commissions for private houses.

Hills' major commissions were for two town halls.  The first was for Bolton Town Hall, for which he won the competition for his design of a scaled-down version of Leeds Town Hall.  He was awarded £120 for the design, which originally included no tower, but one was added later.  During its construction, Hill was assisted by a local architect, George Woodhouse, but the design was entirely Hill's.  The final cost of the town hall came to £167,000, this being the most expensive town hall built up to that time.  Ten years later, the counsellors of Portsmouth invited Hill to design a town hall in a similar style to that of Bolton, but on a larger scale.  Hill's design for the town hall, now known as Portsmouth Guildhall, added ten domes at its corners to enliven its sky-line.  The architectural historian Nikolaus Pevsner commented that it is "one of the grandest gestures of municipal pride".

Later life

Hill practised in sequence from three offices in Leeds and, in common with other architects, took in pupils.  One of these was his son, William Longfield Hill (1864–1929), who succeeded him in the practice.  In 1868 he joined in partnership with Salmon L. Swann of Sheffield.  It was a loose arrangement, in that each continued to practise from his own office and, although attribution was sometimes given to "Hill and Swann", most of the designs were produced independently.  From 1874, Hill lived in The Heath, Adel, a house he designed for himself to the north of Leeds, where he died in 1889.  His estate amounted to a little over £8,181.  He was buried with his wife in the churchyard of St John, Adel.  Their monument, by Hodgson of Leeds, has been designated as a Grade II listed building.

Key

Notable extant works

Notes

References

Bibliography

1827 births
1889 deaths
19th-century English architects
Gothic Revival architects
British neoclassical architects
English ecclesiastical architects
Architects from Leeds